The  Philadelphia Eagles season was the franchise's 37th season in the National Football League. They improved on their previous output of 2–12, winning four games. Despite the improvement, the team failed to qualify for the playoffs for the ninth consecutive season.

The Eagles wore both green (for road games) and white (for home games) helmets during the season.  The white helmets would become part of the Eagles' permanent uniform for the subsequent four seasons.

Philadelphia became the first NFL team to play home games on artificial turf as Franklin Field installed AstroTurf prior to this season. The Houston Oilers of the AFL were in their second season on AstroTurf; they moved into the Astrodome the previous year.

Offseason

NFL Draft 
The 1969 NFL/AFL draft was the third and final year in which the NFL and American Football League (AFL) held a joint draft of college players. The draft took place on January 28–29, and the Eagles alternated with the Atlanta Falcons in picking second and third over the seventeen rounds.

The draft began with first overall pick of O. J. Simpson, the Heisman Trophy-winning running back from USC, by the AFL's Buffalo Bills. In a 14-game 1968 season the Eagles had no wins until November 28 (week 12) when they defeated the Detroit Lions (4–8–2) in Detroit 12–0, and on December 8 (week 13) the New Orleans Saints (4–9–1) in Philadelphia 29–17. This gave the Eagles a better record than Buffalo (1–12–1) by half a game, and equaled the record of the Atlanta Falcons (2–12), who won the coin flip for the rights to the second pick in the draft, offensive tackle George Kunz from Notre Dame. Future hall of famer "Mean" Joe Greene, defensive tackle from North Texas State, was taken fourth by the Pittsburgh Steelers (2–11–1).

Player selections

Roster

Schedule 

Note: Intra-division opponents are in bold text.

Standings

References 

Philadelphia Eagles seasons
Philadelphia Eagles
Philadel